The Minister of Finance is the head of the Ministry of Finance and a member of the Cabinet of the Netherlands. The current Minister of Finance is Sigrid Kaag of the Democrats 66, who has been in office since 10 January 2022. Kaag is the first female Minister of Finance of the Netherlands.

Ministers of Finance (since 1866)
For full list, see List of Ministers of Finance of the Netherlands.

List of State Secretaries for Finance

 Resigned.
 Appointment: Fons van der Stee appointed Minister of Agriculture and Fisheries; Willem Vermeend appointed Minister of Social Affairs and Employment; Joop Wijn appointed Minister of Economic Affairs; Jan Kees de Jager appointed Minister of Finance.

See also
 Ministry of Finance

References

Finance